Franz Lachner's Octet in B-flat major, Op. 156 is a composition for eight wind instruments composed around 1850. While scored for a chamber ensemble, the work is considered to be symphonic in scope.

Instrumentation

The composition is scored for flute, oboe, 2 clarinets , 2 horns and 2 bassoons. This scoring is shared with the octets composed by Theodore Gouvy (Op. 71) and Carl Reinecke (Op. 216).  It is unclear why Lachner elected to replace one of the oboes in the standard Harmonie with a flute, but Rentería notes that, at the time the Octet was composed flutes were beginning to be made out of metal, producing a stronger sound that better blended with the other instruments.

Structure

The composition is in four movements:

Allegro moderato
Adagio
Scherzo: Allegro assai
Finale: Allegro non troppo

A typical performance takes around 25 minutes.

References
Notes

Sources

External links
 
 
 

Compositions by Franz Lachner
Compositions for octet
1850 compositions
Compositions in B-flat major